Milestones is a studio album by American jazz trumpeter, bandleader, and composer Miles Davis. It was recorded with his "first great quintet" augmented as a sextet and released in 1958 by Columbia Records.

Composition 
Tenor saxophonist John Coltrane's return to Davis' group in 1958 coincided with the "modal phase" albums: Milestones  and Kind of Blue (1959) are both considered essential examples of 1950s modern jazz. Davis at this point was experimenting with modes – scale patterns other than major and minor.

Davis plays both trumpet and piano on "Sid's Ahead", a blues which is reminiscent of "Walkin'" that Davis had recorded under the title "Weirdo" for Blue Note in 1954. He plays trumpet in the ensemble passages and solos on trumpet but moves to the piano to accompany the saxophonists in Garland's absence. "Billy Boy" is a solo feature for Garland and the rhythm section.

Critical reception 
In a five-star review, AllMusic's Thom Jurek called Milestones a classic album with blues material in both bebop and post-bop veins, as well as the "memorable" title track, which introduced modalism in jazz and defined Davis' subsequent music in the years to follow. Andy Hermann of PopMatters felt that the album offers more aggressive swinging than Kind of Blue and showcases the first session between saxophonists Coltrane and Cannonball Adderley, whose different styles "feed off each other and push each musician to greater heights." Jim Santella of All About Jazz said that the quality of the personnel Davis enlisted was "the very best", even though the sextet was short-lived, and that Milestones is "a seminal album that helped shape jazz history."

The Penguin Guide to Jazz selected the album as part of its suggested "Core Collection", calling it "one of the very great modern-jazz albums."

Stereo remix and remaster 
Milestones was originally released in mono, as well as in electronically re-channeled stereo (also called pseudo-stereo). The album was remixed and remastered in stereo for The Complete Columbia Recordings of Miles Davis with John Coltrane and, in 2001, reissued in stereo on the Columbia/Legacy label.

Track listing 
Side one
 "Dr. Jekyll" (titled "Dr. Jackle" on later LP and CD releases) – 5:55 (Jackie McLean)
 "Sid's Ahead" – 13:13 (Miles Davis)
 "Two Bass Hit" – 5:19 (John Lewis, Dizzy Gillespie)

Side two
 "Miles" (titled "Milestones" on later LP and CD releases) – 5:49 (Davis)
 "Billy Boy" – 7:19 (Traditional; arranged by Ahmad Jamal)
 "Straight, No Chaser" – 10:41 (Thelonious Monk)

Sides one and two were combined as tracks 1–6 on CD reissues.
CD reissue bonus tracks
 "Two Bass Hit" (alternate take) – 4:29
 "Milestones" (alternate take) – 5:58
 "Straight, No Chaser" (alternate take) – 10:28

Tracks 3–9 recorded on February 4, 1958; tracks 1–2 recorded on March 4, 1958.

Personnel 
 Miles Davis – trumpet, piano (on "Sid's Ahead")
 Julian "Cannonball" Adderley – alto saxophone
 John Coltrane – tenor saxophone
 Red Garland – piano (except on "Sid's Ahead")
 Paul Chambers – double bass
 Philly Joe Jones – drums

References

External links 
 
 

1958 albums
Albums produced by George Avakian
Albums recorded at CBS 30th Street Studio
Columbia Records albums
Miles Davis albums